"Don't Let Me Down" is a song by American production duo the Chainsmokers featuring vocals from American singer Daya. It was released on February 5, 2016, through Disruptor Records and Columbia Records. The song was written by Andrew Taggart, Emily Warren, and Scott Harris. It was released as the radio single follow-up to "Roses".

"Don't Let Me Down" became both the Chainsmokers' and Daya's first top-five single on the US Billboard Hot 100, peaking at number three. It also became the Chainsmokers' second consecutive top 10 entry after "Roses", which peaked at number six. It reached the top 10 in several countries, including Australia, Austria, Canada, Germany, New Zealand, Sweden, and the United Kingdom. A set of remixes for the song, was released on April 15, 2016. A music video for the song was released on April 29, 2016, with appearances from the Chainsmokers and Daya.

The song won a Grammy Award for Best Dance Recording.

In 2021, the song received a diamond certification by the RIAA for selling 10 million units in the United States.

Background and composition
In an interview, Taggart stated that he first created the drop during a flight. The duo later added a "big, echoey guitar sound" to the song, inspired by the bands the xx and Explosions in the Sky, by using a Fender electric guitar and a software plugin. Emily Warren and Scott Harris convened with the duo to create the melody and lyrics. However, the vocalist was not chosen until Taggart heard Daya's "Hide Away", after which the duo enlisted her to record the vocals in the studio. The song was originally intended for Rihanna, but her team rejected it.

The key of the song was originally a step lower, but the duo changed it in order to better accommodate Daya's range. The third drop, which includes the saxophone, was created later in the process. The song has a double-time tempo of 80 beats per minute and a key of G♯ minor. "Don't Let Me Down" follows a chord progression of EBFGm, and Daya's vocals span from G3 to C5.

Critical reception
“Don’t Let Me Down” received critical acclaim. Robbie Daw of Idolator stated "[Don't Let Me Down] kicks off with a haunting guitar loop and 17-year-old Daya lamenting that she's 'crashing, hit a wall, right now I need a miracle.' By the time the chorus sweeps in, the song shifts into full-on trap mode" and called it a "trappy collaboration". Popdust's Jason Scott claimed "[Don't Let Me Down] is an enormously engaging strip of gritty dance-club euphoria. Percussion vibrates underneath a well-constructed skyscraper of synth and evocative vocals from the 17-year-old Daya." Rolling Stone named "Don't Let Me Down" one of the 30 best songs of the first half of 2016, writing "EDM may not dominate the charts the way it used to but the Chainsmokers' swirling, turnt-up love song proves the genre has a little fight left in it. Newcomer Daya goes to battle with the aggro, big room beats and ends up coming out on top."

Chart performance
In the United States, the single debuted at number 85 on the US Billboard Hot 100 for the week of February 27, 2016 but fell off the chart the next week. It made a re-entry at number 81 for the week of March 12, 2016. The song reached a peak of number three for the week of July 16, 2016, and spent 23 weeks in the top 10; it was later named the eighth best-performing single of the year by Billboard (two spots above the duo's number-one hit "Closer").

In the United Kingdom, "Don't Let Me Down" became the Chainsmokers' highest-charting hit (until "Closer" which reached the top of the chart in September 2016) when the song reached number two on the UK Singles Chart on the issue dated July 21, 2016, spending 11 weeks in the top 10.

Music video
The music video for the song was released to YouTube on April 29, 2016.

In the video, Andrew Taggart and Alex Pall (the Chainsmokers) get into a yellow convertible, lowrider at sunrise and begin to drive down a wooded mountain road. Intercut with shots of them driving is Daya, dressed in black leather pants and jacket, singing in a misty field full of bushes. Taggart and Pall stop the car when Daya, surrounded by dancers dressed similarly to her, stand in the middle of the road, blocking it. Daya sings as the girls perform dance moves around her while Taggart and Pall watch from the car. Suddenly, the cars hydraulic suspension begins bouncing up and down on its wheels. As the beat progresses, the rocking of the car becomes more violent and aggressive. Towards the end of the song, the rocking lifts Taggart and Pall out of the car and they are suspended in the air as the girls disperse. The music video was based around the show Supernatural, Taggart and Pall, representing Sam and Dean as they encounter and face in the woods a group of witches.

As of September 2022, the video has received 1.8 billion views on YouTube.

Cover versions 
Usher covered "Don't Let Me Down" in BBC Radio 1's Live Lounge on September 5, 2016.

Denver, CO heavy metal band, Immortal Sÿnn, released a cover of the song on November 3, 2016.

Singer Joy Williams released a cover of the song on March 12, 2017.

Lyca Gairanod, winner of The Voice Kids Philippines first season, covered the song in a local morning show Umagang Kay Ganda (Lit. A Morning So Beautiful) in early 2017.

In other media 
The song was featured in the television series Lucifer, Degrassi: Next Class and Younger.

In March 2017, the Joy Williams version of the song was used in a State Farm Insurance commercial.

The song is featured as exclusive content on Just Dance 2017s subscription-based content, Just Dance Unlimited.

An instrumental version was used prominently as part of the BBC's 2017 UK General Election coverage.

It was played during the swimsuit competition of Miss Universe 2016.

Track listing

Charts

Weekly charts

Year-end charts

Decade-end charts

Certifications

Release history

References

2016 singles
2016 songs
The Chainsmokers songs
Daya (singer) songs
Songs written by Andrew Taggart
Songs written by Emily Warren
Songs written by Scott Harris (songwriter)
Indie pop songs
Trap music (EDM) songs
Disruptor Records singles
Columbia Records singles
Sony Music singles
Grammy Award for Best Dance Recording